Wimberly or Wimberley may refer to:

Surname
Abner Wimberly (1926–1976), American football player
Anthony Wimberly (born 1962), American serial killer
Benjie E. Wimberly (born 1964), American politician
Byron Wimberly (1892–1956), American football player and coach
Corey Wimberly (born 1983), American baseball player and manager
Don Wimberly (born 1937), American Episcopal bishop
Douglas Wimberley (1896–1983), British Army officer
George J. Wimberly (1914–1995), American architect
John Wimberley (born 1945), American photographer and artist
Lorris M. Wimberly (1898–1962), American politician
Marcus Wimberly (born 1974), American football player
Patrick Wimberly (born 1983), American musician
Ronald Wimberly (born 1979), American cartoonist and illustrator
Rush Wimberly (1873–1943), American politician

Other
 5555 Wimberly, main-belt asteroid
 Wimberley, Texas, city in Hays County, Texas, United States

See also
 Wemberley, nickname for Wembley Stadium, London